Jamileh (also Romanized as Jamīleh) is a village in Eram Rural District, Eram District, Dashtestan County, Bushehr Province, Iran. At the 2006 census, its population was 471, in 101 families.

References 

Populated places in Dashtestan County